Kenneth Stephen Jasper AM (born 5 June 1938) is a former Nationals member for Murray Valley in the Victorian Legislative Assembly. He was first elected in 1976 and announced his retirement from the Legislative Assembly effective from the 2010 Victorian Legislative Assembly election.

Career
He joined the family automotive business as an apprentice motor mechanic and spray painter.

Ken Jasper entered Parliament in 1976, succeeding Bill Baxter who, because of a redistribution, stood for the neighbouring seat of Benambra. Jasper went on to win the subsequent 10 elections. In the November 2006 Victorian Legislative Assembly election he won all 29 booths in the electorate of Murray Valley.

On 24 August 2009, he announced his intention to retire at the 2010 Victorian Legislative Assembly election.

Jasper publicly broke from his party when he endorsed independent candidate Cathy McGowan for the seat of Indi over the candidate of the Liberal party, Sophie Mirabella.

Issues
 Oaklands branch railway gauge conversion.

Honours
On 11 June 2012, Jasper was named a Member of the Order of Australia for "service to the Parliament of Victoria, and to the community of the Murray Valley, through advocacy and support roles for the performing arts, multicultural, transport, health and emergency service organisations."

Personal life
Jasper married Annette Joy Griffiths on 2 January 1971 and together they have two children, Leigh and Sally.

References

1938 births
Living people
Members of the Victorian Legislative Assembly
National Party of Australia members of the Parliament of Victoria
People educated at Scotch College, Melbourne
Members of the Order of Australia
21st-century Australian politicians